William Harris (April 29, 1765 – October 18, 1829), an Episcopal priest, was the sixth president of Columbia College, serving from 1811 to 1829. In a compromise, John Mitchell Mason, a Presbyterian minister who was denied the presidency, became the university's first provost and chief operating officer.

Early life and education
William Harris was born at Springfield, Massachusetts, April 29, 1765. His mother was Sarah, a granddaughter of Wm. Pynchon, the founder of Springfield, and his father Daniel was a deacon in the Congregational Church. Harris graduated from Harvard College in 1786, and he began as a minister, but soon retired due to health issues. He turned to the study of medicine and during that time converted to the Episcopalian Church. His health recovered and he rejoined the ministry.

Academic career
After rectoring in Marblehead, Massachusetts, he was made a deacon on October 16, 1791, in Trinity Church, New York, and advanced to the priesthood on the following Sunday in St. George's Chapel. On November 3 of that year he married Martha, the daughter of the Rev. Jonas
Clark, of Lexington, Massachusetts. They had seven children.

Harris continued to officiate both as teacher and preacher until 1801, when he received a unanimous call to St. Mark's Church in-the-Bowery to fill the vacancy caused by the death of the Rev. Mr. Callahan. On February 2, 1802, he was inducted as rector. In 1811, Harris was elected president of Columbia College and received the degree of Doctor of Divinity from Harvard and Columbia. At the same time, Dr. John M. Mason, the
prominent Presbyterian divine, who had been proposed for the presidency, was made provost, an office created for him and carrying with it some of the administrative duties. This lightening of the president's work enabled Harris to retain the rectorship of St. Mark's until 1816, when the resignation of Dr. Mason gave Harris all the duties of president. He was elected a member of the American Antiquarian Society in 1814.

Harris died at Columbia College, on October 18, 1829, and was buried in a vault at St. Mark's.

Notes

Presidents of Columbia University
Converts to Anglicanism from Congregationalism
1765 births
1829 deaths
People from Marblehead, Massachusetts
Harvard University alumni
Members of the American Antiquarian Society